Víctor Manuel González Reyes (born 17 June 1965) is a Mexican politician affiliated with the National Action Party. As of 2014 he served as Deputy of the LIX Legislature of the Mexican Congress representing Baja California.

References

1965 births
Living people
Politicians from Tijuana
National Action Party (Mexico) politicians
Deputies of the LIX Legislature of Mexico
Members of the Chamber of Deputies (Mexico) for Baja California